Kand Sar or Kandsar may refer to various places in Iran:
 Kandsar, Langarud, Gilan Province
 Kandsar-e Shekar Kesh, Langarud County, Gilan Province
 Kandsar-e Zeyn Pareh, Langarud County, Gilan Province
 Kand Sar, Chaboksar, Rudsar County, Gilan Province
 Kandsar, Kelachay, Rudsar County, Gilan Province
 Kandsar-e Bibalan, Rudsar County, Gilan Province
 Kand Sar, Mazandaran